Sheykh Malu (also Romanized as Sheykh Malū and Sheikh Maloo; also known as Shaikh ‘Amli, Shekhamlū, Shekhemlū, Sheykhamlū, and Shikhamli) is a village in Ozomdel-e Jonubi Rural District, in the Central District of Varzaqan County, East Azerbaijan Province, Iran. At the 2006 census, its population was 253, in 51 families.

References 

Towns and villages in Varzaqan County